Manglerud Star Ishockey, commonly known as Manglerud Star and abbreviated as MS, is a Norwegian ice hockey team based in Oslo, Norway. They currently play in the GET-ligaen, after replacing the bankrupt Rosenborg IHK in the summer of 2014.

Manglerud Star was founded in 1967 and was promoted to the top division in 1973. The club enjoyed a spell of success in the late 1970s, winning two national championships, to date the club's only trophies. In modern times, the club is still widely regarded to have one of the best youth academies in Norwegian hockey. Manglerud play their home games at Manglerudhallen.

History

The multi-sports club SK Star was founded on 23 June 1913 at Akershus Festning in Oslo. In 1964, the club merged with Manglerud IL, to form Manglerud Star IL. The ice hockey division became active three years later. The first, and to date only, titles would come in the late 70s, with the club winning the national championships in 1977 and 1978. The 90s would be an unstable decade for Manglerud, with the club unsuccessfully attempting mergers with other Oslo-based clubs, most notably with Furuset to create Spektrum Flyers.

In the 2004/05 season, Manglerud Star was relegated from the top flight due to financial problems. After spending four season on the second tier, Manglerud finally qualified for GET-ligaen again for the 2009/10 season. The club was relegated again following the 2011/12 season, but regained the top flight spot following Rosenborg IHKs bankruptcy in the summer of 2014.

Manglerud has delivered more players to professional ice hockey leagues around the world than any other hockey team in Norway. In 2004, the city of Oslo provided funding for a renovation of Manglerudhallen, which also includes a football arena beside the hockey rink.

Season-by-season results
This is a partial list of the last five seasons completed by Manglerud Star. For the full season-by-season history, see List of Manglerud Star Ishockey seasons.

1 Rosenborg failed to renew its professional license to play in the GET-liga. The vacant spot was given to Manglerud Star.

Retired numbers

See also
IL Manglerud Star
Manglerud Star Toppfotball

References

External links

 
Ice hockey teams in Norway
Sport in Oslo
GET-ligaen teams